The following are the football (soccer) events of the year 1943 throughout the world.

Events

Cartagines defeat Espanola by the extraordinary score of 9-8 in the Costa Rican First Division.

Winners club national championship 
 Argentina: Boca Juniors
 Austria: Vienna
 Chile: Unión Española
 Costa Rica: Universidad de Costa Rica
 Croatia: Građanski Zagreb
 Germany: Dresdner SC
 Italy: Torino F.C.
 Mexico: Mars
 Paraguay: Libertad
 Scotland
 Scottish Cup: No competition
 Spain: Athletic Bilbao
 Sweden: IFK Norrköping
 Switzerland: Grasshoppers
 Turkey: Fenerbahçe
 Uruguay: Nacional

Births 
 24 January – Manuel Velázquez, Spanish international footballer (died 2016)
 13 March – Giancarlo De Sisti, Italian international footballer
 25 April – Angelo Anquilletti, Italian international footballer (died 2015)
 4 May – Georgi Asparuhov, Bulgarian international footballer (died 1971)
 16 May – Ove Kindvall, Swedish international footballer
 3 June – Werner Lihsa, East German international footballer
 14 June – Piet Keizer, Dutch international footballer (died 2017)
 18 August – Gianni Rivera, Italian international footballer
 10 September – Horst-Dieter Höttges, German international footballer
 29 September – Wolfgang Overath, German international footballer
 26 October –  Tommy Gemmell, Scottish international footballer and manager (died 2017)
 28 October – Pim Doesburg, Dutch international footballer (died 2020)
 6 November – Roberto Telch, Argentine international footballer (died 2014)
 7 December – Akbar Eftekhari, Iranian international footballer (died 2017)
 22 December – Juan Mujica, Uruguayan international footballer and manager (died 2016)

Deaths
 9 March – Franz Krumm (33), German international footballer (born 1909)
 10 October – Frits Kuipers (44), Dutch footballer (born 1899)

References

 
Association football by year